Mykhaylo Volodymyrovych Olefirenko (born 6 June 1960 in Mykolaiv) is a retired Ukrainian professional football coach and a former player.

Olefirenko began his professional playing career with FC Dynamo Kyiv and he won three Soviet Top League and one Soviet Cup titles with the club.

Honours
 Soviet Top League champion: 1980, 1985, 1986.
 Soviet Top League runner-up: 1982.
 Soviet Cup winner: 1982.

References

External links
 
 

1960 births
Living people
Soviet footballers
Soviet expatriate footballers
Ukrainian footballers
Ukrainian expatriate footballers
Expatriate footballers in Czechoslovakia
Expatriate footballers in Austria
Expatriate footballers in Israel
FC Bukovyna Chernivtsi players
FC Dynamo Kyiv players
FC Shakhtar Donetsk players
FC Guria Lanchkhuti players
NK Veres Rivne players
Soviet Top League players
1. FC Tatran Prešov players
Hapoel Hadera F.C. players
FC Krystal Kherson managers
FC Tobol managers
Association football defenders
Ukrainian football managers
Ukrainian expatriate sportspeople in Israel
Ukrainian expatriate sportspeople in Austria
Sportspeople from Mykolaiv